Pedro Matías, O.F.M. (died 1615) was a Roman Catholic prelate who was appointed as Bishop of Nueva Caceres (1612–1615).

Biography
Pedro Matías was ordained a priest in the Order of Friars Minor.
On 17 September 1612, he was appointed during the papacy of Pope Paul V as Bishop of Nueva Caceres. 
He died before he was consecrated in 1615.

References

External links and additional sources
 (for Chronology of Bishops) 
 (for Chronology of Bishops) 

17th-century Roman Catholic bishops in the Philippines
Bishops appointed by Pope Paul V
1615 deaths
Franciscan bishops